Ivan Dresser (Ivan Chandler Dresser; July 3, 1896 – December 27, 1956) was an American athlete who competed mainly in the 3000 metre team. He was a 1919 graduate of Cornell University and a member of the Sphinx Head Society. He competed for the United States in the 1920 Summer Olympics held in Antwerp, Belgium in the 3000 metre team where he won the gold medal with his team mates Horace Brown and Arlie Schardt.

He was born in Flandreau, South Dakota and died in New York City. His granddaughter is renowned Mexican political analyst and researcher Denise Dresser.

References

External links
 profile

1896 births
1956 deaths
People from Flandreau, South Dakota
Track and field athletes from South Dakota
American male long-distance runners
Athletes (track and field) at the 1920 Summer Olympics
Cornell University alumni
Olympic gold medalists for the United States in track and field
Medalists at the 1920 Summer Olympics